Bootstrapping is a self-starting process that is supposed to proceed without external input.

Bootstrapping, bootstrap, or bootstraps may also refer to:
 Bootstrap (front-end framework),  a free collection of tools for creating websites and web applications
 Bootstrap curriculum, a curriculum which uses computer programming to teach algebra to students age 12–16
 Bootstrap funding in entrepreneurship and startups
 Bootstrap model, a class of theories in quantum physics
 Conformal bootstrap, a mathematical method to constrain and solve models in particle physics
 Bootstrapping (compilers), the process of writing a compiler in the programming language it is intended to compile
 Bootstrapping (electronics), a type of circuit that employs positive feedback
 Bootstrapping (finance), a method for constructing a yield curve from the prices of coupon-bearing products
 Bootstrapping (law), a former rule of evidence in U.S. federal conspiracy trials
 Bootstrapping (linguistics), a term used in language acquisition
 Bootstrapping (statistics), a method for assigning measures of accuracy to sample estimates
 Bootstrap aggregating, a method used to improve the stability and accuracy of machine learning algorithms
 Bootstraps, the stage name of American singer and songwriter Jordan Beckett
 Bootstraps: From an American Academic of Color

See also
 Boot (disambiguation)
 "By His Bootstraps", a science fiction novella by Robert A. Heinlein